Himmat Singh Rai (born 18 May 1987) is an Indian professional golfer who won the 2011 ISPS Handa Singapore Classic.

Professional wins (4)

Asian Tour wins (1)

Asian Tour playoff record (1–1)

Professional Golf Tour of India wins (2)

Jamega Pro Golf Tour wins (1)

References

External links

Indian male golfers
Asian Tour golfers
Golfers from Delhi
People from New Delhi
1987 births
Living people